Melissa Dowse (born 27 April 1982) is a former professional tennis player from Australia.

Biography
Dowse, who grew up in Gosford, was a top 20 ranked junior and represented Australia at the 1998 World Youth Cup held in Italy.

A right-handed player, Dowse is most noted for appearing twice in the singles main draw of the Australian Open. In the 2000 Australian Open she received a wildcard and faced German qualifier Jana Kandarr in a first round match she lost 6–8 in the third set, having held a match point. She returned for the 2001 Australian Open as another wildcard entrant and this time won her first round match over Alexandra Fusai in three sets, the last of which she claimed 6–0. In the second round she was easily defeated by Silvia Farina Elia.

In 2001 she won three ITF doubles titles over the course of a month in Japan partnering with Samantha Stosur.

ITF Circuit finals

Doubles (4–2)

References

External links
 
 

1982 births
Living people
Australian female tennis players
People from Gosford
Tennis people from New South Wales